The Downcounty Consortium (DCC) is a group of five high schools in part of Montgomery County, Maryland, USA. The high schools are Albert Einstein High School, John F. Kennedy High School, Montgomery Blair High School, Wheaton High School and Northwood High School.

Introduced in 2004, each Downcounty Consortium high school offers different academy programs catered to the interests of a student. These academies are open to all students in the Downcounty Consortium area. After a student chooses one academy and takes four of that particular academy's classes, the student is eligible for a special certificate. Students also participate in internships as they are referred through the program.

The schools that feed into the Downcounty Consortium are Argyle Middle School, Eastern Middle School, Col. E. Brooke Lee Middle School, A. Mario Loiederman Middle School, Newport Mill Middle School, Parkland Middle School, Sligo Middle School, Silver Spring International Middle School and Takoma Park Middle School.

Choice process
The Downcounty Consortium choice process allows students to request certain high schools to attend. The students rank high schools by preference, which is often related to the school's academies. They are then entered into a lottery system that assigns students' schools based on factors such as preferences, capacity and socio-economic status. Students may also opt to choose their base high school, in which case they are guaranteed to be assigned to that school. An academy is a set of classes that focus on a specific subject, such as theater, photography, or law. Unlike in a magnet where students must pass a test to be accepted, students get into academies by requesting them at the end of ninth grade, and begin them in tenth grade.

List of Downcounty Consortium academies by school

Montgomery Blair High School
Entrepreneurship and Business Management
Human Service Professions
International Studies and Law
Media, Music, and The Arts
Science, Technology, Engineering, and Math

Albert Einstein High School
Finance, Business Management, and Marketing
International Baccalaureate (IB) Program
Renaissance (mixed subjects)
Visual and Performing Arts

John F. Kennedy High School
Business Management
Health Careers
International Baccalaureate Diploma Program
Media Communications
Naval Junior Reserve Officer Training Corps (NJROTC)

Northwood High School
Humanities, Arts, and Media (HAM)
Musical Theater
Politics, Advocacy, and Law (PAL)
Technology, Environmental, and Systems Sciences (TESS)

Wheaton High School
Biosciences and Health Professions
Engineering
Information Technology (AOIT)
Institute for Global and Cultural Studies (IGCS)

References

External links
 

Public schools in Montgomery County, Maryland